Robert White was an American Negro league second baseman in the 1920s.

White played for the Toledo Tigers in 1923. In six recorded games, he posted seven hits in 25 plate appearances.

References

External links
 and Seamheads

Year of birth missing
Year of death missing
Place of birth missing
Place of death missing
Toledo Tigers players
Baseball second basemen